The Solomons cockatoo (Cacatua ducorpsii), also known as the Ducorps's cockatoo, Solomons corella or broad-crested corella, is a species of cockatoo endemic to the Solomon Islands archipelago. This small white cockatoo is larger than the Tanimbar corella yet smaller than the umbrella cockatoo. The species is common across most of the Solomons, absent only from Makira in the south. It inhabits lowland rainforests, secondary forests, cleared areas and gardens.

Description
They are predominantly white. They have a blue eye ring and a recumbent crest which resembles a sail in its raised state. As other members of the subgenus Licmetis, it has a pale bill.

Distribution & population 
The Solomons cockatoo is abundant on all islands in the archipelago except Makira and surrounding islands. Ornithologists estimate that the bird has a population of around 100,000 individual birds. It has been listed as Least Concern by the International Union for Conservation of Nature.

Breeding
The Solomons cockatoo nests in tree cavities. The eggs are white and there are usually two in a clutch. The eggs are incubated for about 25 days and the chicks leave the nest about 62 days after hatching. Wild birds typically breed from July–September.

References

Solomons cockatoo
Endemic birds of the Solomon Islands
Solomons cockatoo